Paul Joseph Krebs (May 26, 1912 – September 17, 1996) was an American labor union official and Democratic Party politician. He served as a U.S. Representative for New Jersey's 12th congressional district for one term from 1965 to 1967.

Early life and career 
Before his election to Congress, Krebs was President of the New Jersey State Congress of Industrial Organizations (1954–1961) and President of the New Jersey United Auto Workers Council (1961–1965).

Congress 
He was elected in 1964 to the 89th United States Congress, but he did not run for reelection in 1966, after his seat was eliminated in redistricting.

Later career 
He later served as director for the New Jersey State Office of Consumer Protection under Governor Richard J. Hughes from 1967 to 1970.

Krebs ran for the United States Senate against Republican incumbent Clifford P. Case in 1972 but lost by almost 30 points. He ran for the House again in 1974, but lost the Democratic primary to Frederick Bohen, who lost the open seat race to Millicent Fenwick.

Death
He died in September 1996 in Hallandale, Florida.

External links

1912 births
1996 deaths
Democratic Party members of the United States House of Representatives from New Jersey
20th-century American politicians
People from Hallandale Beach, Florida
Politicians from New York City